Rhabdias alabialis is a species of parasitic nematode in the family Rhabdiasidae. It was first found in lungs of the cane toad Bufo marinus in Costa Rica and Nicaragua. It can be distinguished from its cogenerates by its head morphology, i.e. its lips or pseudolabia absence, a slitlike oral opening, and its buccal capsule being triangular shaped in the apical view.

References

Further reading
Santos, Jeannie Nascimento dos, et al. "Rhabdias paraensis sp. nov.: a parasite of the lungs of Rhinella marina (Amphibia: Bufonidae) from Brazilian Amazonia." Memórias do Instituto Oswaldo Cruz 106.4 (2011): 433-440.
Martínez-Salazar, Elizabeth A., and Virginia León-Règagnon. "New species of Rhabdias (Nematoda: Rhabdiasidae) from Bufo occidentalis (Anura: Bufonidae) from Sierra Madre del Sur, Mexico." Journal of Parasitology 93.5 (2007): 1171-1177.
Martínez-Salazar, Elizabeth A. "Una especie nueva de rhabdiásido de Craugastor occidentalis (Anura: Brachycephalidae) de la sierra de Manantlán, Jalisco, México." Revista mexicana de biodiversidad 79.1 (2008): 81-89.

Rhabditida
Nematodes described in 2007